Mitchell Charles Alan Walker (born 24 September 1991 in St Albans, Hertfordshire) is an English professional footballer who last played for Aldershot Town as a goalkeeper.

Career
Walker made his professional debut for Brighton & Hove Albion on the last day of the 2009–10 season starting in the 1–0 victory over Yeovil Town at the Withdean Stadium.

During January 2011, Walker signed on loan with Conference South side Welling United. On 1 March 2012, Walker joined Eastbourne Borough for a second loan spell.

Walker spent seven years at Dover Athletic before joining Aldershot Town in the Summer of 2019. He went onto feature 93 times for the Hampshire-based side before leaving in July 2022.

Career statistics

References

External links

1991 births
Living people
English footballers
Association football goalkeepers
Brighton & Hove Albion F.C. players
Eastbourne Borough F.C. players
Welling United F.C. players
Dover Athletic F.C. players
Aldershot Town F.C. players
English Football League players
National League (English football) players
England semi-pro international footballers
Sportspeople from St Albans